Saligny is a commune in the Yonne department in Bourgogne-Franche-Comté in north-central France.

Economy 
Since 1957 the head office and the main milk processing unit of Fromagerie Lincet has been located in Saligny. This processor of the dairy manufactures, under its brand name Lincet, produces industrial cheese classified by denomination of origin  (AOC) such as Chaource, Époisses,  etc. and also fancy trademarked cheeses such as "Délice de Bourgogne", "Délice Papaye", "Tutti From", "Rond des Vignes", etc.

See also
Communes of the Yonne department
List of French cheeses

References

Communes of Yonne